The Pammegistoi Taxiarches church is a Byzantine church located in the Upper Town of Thessaloniki, Greece. The church was built in the 14th century, and served as a mosque during the Ottoman period, before it was turned back into a church in 1912. The church underwent significant modifications during the 1950s and the 1960s, and unlike other Byzantine churches in Thessaloniki, a new section was added in neo-Byzantine style.

History 
The erection of the church is usually dated to early fourteenth century. During the Ottoman rule of Thessaloniki, it was converted into a mosque, but it is not clear when. Some of the church's windows were sealed so a mihrab could be built, access to the north aisle was prohibited, changes were made to the openings in the chancel and deaconry arches and part of the part of the north wall was reconstructed with Islamic-style windows. An extension was added in the south side, which had to be supported by wooden columns due to ground slope, and a narthex was built on the western side. A two-balcony minaret was built on the southwest side.

The church was given back to Christian worship in 1912 upon the liberation of Thessaloniki in the Balkan wars, but from 1914 until 1916 it housed several Greek refugees from Thrace, and as a result it suffered some damage. In order for it to be used as a Christian church again several modifications had to be done in order for the room to be conjoined and better lit. In specific, the western wall of the central and northern aisle had to be torn down, making the northern aisle a section of the portico, which thus became Π-shaped, as opposed to its previous Γ shape. The minaret was torn down and the mihrab was removed. The western part of the portico was sealed with glass panes and new roof tiles were installed, brought from Villa Allatini. The precinct and the propylon of the church were built in 1939.

Pammegistoi Taxiarches received its final and current shape during the 1950s. The priests serving the church had been asking for the church to be extended for some years, due to the rising population growth of the Upper Town, before the architect Iraklis Leontidis undertook the extension of the church. The study was approved by the ministry on November 5 1951, and by the Directorate of Restorations and Ecclesiastical Architecture and Anastasios Orlandos on November 12, who pointed out some modifications to the plans. The neo-Byzantine style of architecture was chosen for the extension. Renovation work began on November 20 of that same year. The works included the repair of the crypt, the demolition of the exonarthex and the extension of the church by six meters. Due to lack of funds, many of the materials used were either sold or reused, as it was the case, for example, for the timber from the slat that was used for the concrete molds. Although the church had reached the stage of roof repair by 1953, work slowed down significantly and funds were sought through fundraisers. The works were finally completed by 1958 with the construction of the porch, the plastering of the interior and the exterior, and the tiling of the bell-tower. Work on the interior of the church continued at a slow pace. For example, the iconostasis plans were only delivered in 1969. It is not clear what sort of modifications took place in the original, Byzantine part of the church, as they were not recorded anywhere, but can be discerned using existing photographs of Pammegistoi Taxiarches before the renovation works.

Description 

The church is a four-aisled basilica, 19.7 metres tall and 15.1 meters wide, without counting the arch of the sanctuary. Three of the aisles of the church are separated by two pairs of columns in their eastern part and two pairs of columns in the western part, while the fourth, the southernmost, is separated from the rest of the church by a colonnade consisting of three Byzantine-era columns and two newer ones. The central arch of the temple has a three-lobed window with colonnades and is pentagonal. The chancel and diaconal both have two arched windows. The chancel has a tripartite arch while the diaconal has no arch. It is now known that the north aisle used to be connected to the prostheses by a three-lobed opening, which later became a single pointed and then a semicircular one.

The entrance to the church is from the western façade. A shelter with two columns supported on the western wall of the temple covers the arched entrance. The entrance is accessed by a double staircase with two branches. The north wall has six apses, one in the plan, one blind and then to the west four double apses with an equal number of arched windows. Then on the north wall there are two newer two-bay windows. The south and west facades have also newer, bilobed windows in neo-Byzantine style. The church's bell-tower stands on the south-west corner of the church.

Pammegistoi Taxiarches, before the renovations that took place during the 1950s and the 1960s, consisted of a central aisle which was surrounded by a Π-shaped portico on the north, west and south. The central nave was joined to the portico through openings in the side aisles. Vaulted apartments were located in the northwest and southwest corners of the portico. The eastern and the northern walls up to the first apse and a half are thought to be dated from the Byzantine period. The rest of the northern wall was rebuilt during the 1950s.

The temple used to have many murals, but it was covered with layers of mortar for years. On the eastern pediment of the central aisle the Ascension of Christ is depicted, and on the western pediment the Pentecost, which only surfaced when the wooden ceiling, dating to Ottoman period, was removed. Those murals have been dated to the second halve or last quarter of the 14th century, during the Palaeologan Renaissance.

Pammegistoi Taxiarches has a semi-underground crypt. Its western and southern parts are newer and the rest is original Byzantine. The entrance to the crypt is from its western side, with the use of a ladder. Like the temple above the ground, it has a central arch and chancel arch.

Gallery

See also 

 Byzantine Revival architecture
 Paleochristian and Byzantine monuments of Thessaloniki
 Church of the Acheiropoietos
 Church of Greece
 Byzantine Greece

References

Bibliography

External links 
 

Byzantine church buildings in Thessaloniki
Commons category link is on Wikidata
14th-century establishments in the Byzantine Empire
Former mosques in Greece
Basilica churches in Greece
Mosques converted from churches in Ottoman Greece
14th-century churches in Greece